Cold Dark Matter may refer to:
 Cold dark matter, a hypothetical form of dark matter in cosmology and physics
 Cold Dark Matter (Psychic TV album)
 Cold Dark Matter (Red Harvest album), 2000